Rahmatullo Zoirov  (born 16 March 1958) is chairman of the Social Democratic Party of Tajikistan. He graduated from the Ukrainian Law Academy in 1983. He is a Candidate of Sciences and speaks more than 10 languages.

References

Living people
Social Democratic Party (Tajikistan) politicians
1958 births